Anuraga Devatha (Benevolent Goddess) is a 1982 Indian Telugu-language drama film produced by Nandamuri Harikrishna for Ramakrishna Cine Studios, and directed by T. Rama Rao. The film stars N. T. Rama Rao, Sridevi and Jayasudha, with music composed by Chakravarthy. It is a remake of the Hindi film Aasha (1980).

Plot 
Ramu is a truck driver who gives a lift to famous singer Rupa Devi when her vehicle breaks down. They become friends. He is already in love with Tulasi, whom he marries. Rupa wishes him well calling him "Nestham" (friend), even though she has fallen in love with him.  Ramu has an accident, and everyone believes that he is dead. His grieving mother tells a pregnant Tulasi to go away. Upset with everything in her life, she jumps from a bridge into the water. She is saved by a young guy, Prakash and his colony members find that she has lost her sight. Thulasi gives birth to a baby girl and names her Ramatulasi, combining her and her husband's names. Prakash gives shelter to them and treats Thulasi as his sister. Ramu turns out to be alive and he learns that Thulasi had killed herself. He becomes depressed. Rupa re-enters his life and helps him overcome his depression. They get engaged. They become acquainted with Ramatulasi, now a little girl, selling little God statues on the street. They are completely enchanted by her, even though they don't know that she is Ramu's daughter. Rupa meets Thulasi and tells her they'll pay for her eye operation, so she can regain her sight. Rupa also invites Thulasi to her wedding with Ramu. After she regains her sight from the operation, she goes to Rupa's wedding and is shocked to see Ramu. She quickly leaves, not wanting to disrupt Rupa and Ramu's lives.  Prakash tells Ramu that Thulasi is still alive and that Ramatulasi is his daughter. Rupa cancels the wedding and tells him to go and reunite with his wife and daughter, which he does. Rupa goes back on stage permanently.

Cast 

N. T. Rama Rao as Ramu
Sridevi as Rupa Devi
Jayasudha as Tulasi
Nandamuri Balakrishna as Prakash
Allu Ramalingaiyah as Papa Rao
Gummadi as Priest
Nutan Prasad as Gopal
Mikkilineni as Sivaiah
Mukkamala as Doctor
Chitti Babu as Violinist
Chidatala Appa Rao as Musician
Annapurna as Ramu's mother
Kavitha as Dhanalakshmi
Rushyendramani as Peddamma
Dubbing Janaki as Doctor
Anuradha Sriram as Ramatulasi

Soundtrack 
Music was composed by Chakravarthy. Lyrics were written by Veturi.

References

External links 
 

1980s Telugu-language films
1982 drama films
1982 films
Films directed by T. Rama Rao
Films scored by K. Chakravarthy
Indian drama films
Telugu remakes of Hindi films